Euphydryas gillettii, or Gillette's checkerspot, is a species of butterfly, common in western North America from British Columbia to Oregon and from the Rocky Mountains to the Pacific Ocean. The species was first described by William Barnes in 1897.

Adults fly from mid-June to early August in Alberta. Its habitats include valleys, glades, open wooded areas in mountains, and streams.

Caterpillars feed on bracted honeysuckle (Lonicera involucrata). Adults feed on nectar from a variety of flowers including wild geranium and yellow composites.

See also
 Euphydryas editha

References

Euphydryas
Butterflies of North America
Butterflies described in 1897